Quinndary Sammy Weatherspoon (born September 10, 1996) is an American professional basketball player for the Tianjin Pioneers of the Chinese Basketball Association (CBA). He played four seasons of college basketball for the Mississippi State Bulldogs. Weatherspoon was selected 49th overall by the San Antonio Spurs in the 2019 NBA draft. After two seasons with the team, he joined the Warriors in 2021. During his first season with the Warriors, he won an NBA championship.

Early life
Born in Canton, Mississippi, Weatherspoon is the son of Sharon and Tommie Weatherspoon and has two younger brothers, Nick and Brandon, who are also basketball players. He began playing basketball in middle school. He starred at Velma Jackson High School, where he was coached by Anthony Carlyle. Velma Jackson won three straight state titles in 2012, 2013 and 2014. Towards the end of his high school career, he was considered a three-star recruit, ranked no. 116 in his class by Rivals.com and later committed to Mississippi State under Ben Howland.

College career
Weatherspoon was named to the SEC All-Freshman Team. He averaged 12.0 points and 4.7 rebounds per game playing alongside Malik Newman.

He injured his wrist against Boise State on November 21, 2016 and was initially ruled out for the season. After missing several games, Weatherspoon came back. As a sophomore, Weatherspoon averaged 16.5 points and 5.1 rebounds per game. Weatherspoon was named to the Second Team All-SEC as a sophomore.

As a junior, Weatherspoon averaged 14.4 points, 6.0 rebounds and 3.3 assists per game and started every game. He earned the Howell Trophy as the best player in Mississippi. Weatherspoon was named second-team All-SEC. On April 6, 2018, Weatherspoon joined his brother Nick Weatherspoon and Lamar Peters among Mississippi State players to declare for the 2018 NBA draft. He later opted to withdraw from the draft and return to Mississippi State.

In his senior season, Weatherspoon was named first-team All-SEC. He became the program’s third player to score 2,000 career points on March 22, 2019 in an upset loss to Liberty on the 2019 NCAA tournament.

Professional career

San Antonio Spurs (2019–2021)
On June 20, 2019, Weatherspoon was selected with the 49th overall pick by the San Antonio Spurs in the 2019 NBA draft. Weatherspoon was later listed in the roster of Spurs for the 2019 NBA Summer League hosted at Vivint Arena.

On July 8, 2019, Weatherspoon signed a two-way contract with the Spurs. He had a career-high 30 points for the Austin Spurs in a 126-123 overtime win over the Greensboro Swarm on January 4, 2020. On February 8, 2020, Weatherspoon had his debut in the NBA, coming off from bench in a 102–122 loss to the Sacramento Kings.

On November 24, 2020, the Spurs announced that they had re-signed Weatherspoon to another two-way contract.

Santa Cruz Warriors (2021)
Weatherspoon joined the Brooklyn Nets for the 2021 NBA Summer League.

On October 11, 2021, the Golden State Warriors signed Weatherspoon, but waived him two days later. In October 2021, Weatherspoon joined the Santa Cruz Warriors as an affiliate player where in nine games, he averaged 16.1 points, 4.3 rebounds, 3.7 assists and 1.22 steals in 27.4 minutes per contest.

Golden State Warriors (2021–2022)
On December 23, 2021, Weatherspoon signed a 10-day contract with the Golden State Warriors. On January 3, 2022, he signed a two-way contract with the Warriors.

On June 16, 2022, Weatherspoon won the 2022 NBA Finals with the Warriors.

On July 22, 2022, Weatherspoon signed another two-way contact with the Warriors.

On October 13, 2022, Weatherspoon was waived by the Warriors.

Career statistics

NBA

|-
| style="text-align:left;"| 
| style="text-align:left;"| San Antonio
| 11 || 0 || 7.1 || .294 || .200 || .500 || .6 || 1.0 || .3 || .1 || 1.1
|-
| style="text-align:left;"| 
| style="text-align:left;"| San Antonio
| 20 || 0 || 6.1 || .457 || .167 ||  .813 || .6 || .4 || .4 || .1 || 2.3
|-
| style="text-align:left;background:#afe6ba;"|†
| style="text-align:left;"| Golden State
| 11 || 0 || 6.6 || .571 || .200 ||  1.000 || 1.3 || .5 || .1 || .1 || 2.7
|- class="sortbottom"
| style="text-align:center;" colspan="2"| Career
| 42 || 0 || 6.5 || .452 || .188 || .826 || .8 || .6 || .3 || .1 || 2.1

College

|-
| style="text-align:left;"| 2015–16
| style="text-align:left;"| Mississippi State
| 31 || 17 || 27.0 || .448 || .394 || .805 || 4.7 || 1.4 || 1.4 || .5 || 12.0
|-
| style="text-align:left;"| 2016–17
| style="text-align:left;"| Mississippi State
| 29 || 29 || 31.9 || .469 || .373 || .766 || 5.1 || 1.8 || 1.7 || .3 || 16.5
|-
| style="text-align:left;"| 2017–18
| style="text-align:left;"| Mississippi State
| 37 || 37 || 31.4 || .484 || .313 || .771 || 6.0 || 3.3 || 1.4 || .3 || 14.4
|-
| style="text-align:left;"| 2018–19
| style="text-align:left;"| Mississippi State
| 34 || 34 || 34.0 || .508 || .396 || .809 || 4.7 || 2.8 || 1.7 || .3 || 18.5
|- class="sortbottom"
| style="text-align:center;" colspan="2"| Career
| 131 || 117 || 31.2 || .480 || .368 || .788 || 5.2 || 2.4 || 1.5 || .4 || 15.4

Personal life
Weatherspoon majored in interdisciplinary studies during college. He is the son of Sharon and Tommie Weatherspoon and has a brother named Nick, who also played college basketball at Mississippi State, and a brother named Brandon, who plays college basketball at Florida Atlantic.

References

External links
Mississippi State Bulldogs bio

1996 births
Living people
American men's basketball players
Austin Spurs players
Basketball players from Mississippi
Golden State Warriors players
Mississippi State Bulldogs men's basketball players
People from Canton, Mississippi
San Antonio Spurs draft picks
San Antonio Spurs players
Santa Cruz Warriors players
Shooting guards